Auxon-Dessus is a former commune in the Doubs department in the Franche-Comté region in eastern France.

On 1 January 2015, Auxon-Dessus and Auxon-Dessous merged becoming one commune called Les Auxons.

Population

See also
 Communes of the Doubs department

References

Former communes of Doubs